Gymnelema vinctus is a moth in the family Psychidae. It is found in South Africa.

References

Natural History Museum Lepidoptera generic names catalog

Endemic moths of South Africa
Psychidae
Moths described in 1865